Bhuvanagiri (station code:BG) is a railway station in Bhuvanagiri Town, Bhuvanagiri district on Secunderabad–Kazipet line.

Services
MEMU service starts from Bhongir railway station to Falaknuma railway station.
 Falaknuma–Bhongir MEMU

References

Railway stations in Yadadri Bhuvanagiri district
Secunderabad railway division